Acanthistius is a genus of fish. Some authors place the genus in the family Serranidae, while some consider it to be incertae sedis, where it is not clear which family it belongs to.

Species
There are 11 species in the genus:
 Acanthistius brasilianus (Cuvier, 1828) – Argentine sea bass
 Acanthistius cinctus (Günther, 1859) – yellowbanded perch
 Acanthistius fuscus Regan, 1913 – Rapanui seabass
Acanthistius joanae Heemstra, 2010 – scalyjaw koester
 Acanthistius ocellatus (Günther, 1859) – eastern wirrah
 Acanthistius pardalotus Hutchins, 1981 – leopard wirrah
 Acanthistius patachonicus (Jenyns, 1840)
 Acanthistius paxtoni Hutchins & Kuiter, 1982 – orangelined wirra
 Acanthistius pictus (Tschudi, 1846) – brick seabass
 Acanthistius sebastoides (Castelnau, 1861) – koester
 Acanthistius serratus (Cuvier, 1828) – western wirrah

References

Anthiinae
Perciformes genera
Taxa named by Marcus Elieser Bloch